Milton C. Lee, Jr. (born January 14, 1960) is an associate judge of the Superior Court of the District of Columbia.

Education and career 
Lee earned his Bachelor of Arts from American University in 1982 and his Juris Doctor from Catholic University’s Columbus School of Law.

After graduating, he served as a staff attorney at the Public Defender Service for the District of Columbia. In 1993, Lee joined the faculty at David A. Clarke School of Law.

D.C. Superior Court 
In November 1998, Lee was appointed as a magistrate judge on the Superior Court of the District of Columbia.

President Barack Obama nominated Lee on January 20, 2010, to a 15-year term as an associate judge of the Superior Court of the District of Columbia to the seat vacated by Jerry Stewart Byrd. On April 20, 2010, the Senate Committee on Homeland Security and Governmental Affairs held a hearing on his nomination.  On April 28, 2010, the Committee reported his nomination favorably to the senate floor. On June 22, 2010, the full Senate confirmed his nomination by voice vote.

References

1960 births
Living people
21st-century African-American people
20th-century African-American people
21st-century American judges
African-American judges
American University alumni
Columbus School of Law alumni
David A. Clarke School of Law faculty
Judges of the Superior Court of the District of Columbia
Lawyers from Washington, D.C.